Alexander Kerr (1892–1964) was an English marine engineer and wholesale newsagent known for his service in the Imperial Trans-Antarctic Expedition.

Alexander Kerr may also refer to:

 Alexander Kerr (banker) (1838–1909), Scottish banker
 Alexander Kerr (professor) (born 1970), American violinist
 Alexander Robert Kerr (1770–1831), Royal Navy officer

See also
 Alex Kerr (disambiguation)